Junri Namigata won the final against Zhang Shuai 7-6(3) 6-3.

Seeds

  Zhang Shuai (final)
  Han Xinyun (semifinals)
  Lee Jin-A (semifinals)
  Junri Namigata (champion)
  Tomoko Yonemura (second round)
  Kim So-Jung (quarterfinals)
  Zhou Yi-miao (first round)
  Rika Fujiwara (quarterfinals)

Main draw

Finals

Top half

Bottom half

References
 Draws on ITF Site

Beijing International Challenger - Women's Singles
2010 Women's Singles
Women in Beijing